Agnes Elisabet Hilden Kittelsen (born 20 May 1980 in Kristiansand) is a Norwegian actress.

Biography 
Agnes Kittelsen is known for her role as Anneli in the TV-series Skolen (2004), as the title character's wife Tikken in the 2008 film Max Manus and as Liv Heyerdahl, the wife of Thor Heyerdahl in the film Kon-Tiki. She also starred in the sitcom Dag from 2010 to 2015.

After graduating from the Norwegian National Academy of Theatre in 2003, she worked at Den Nationale Scene from 2004 to 2006, before starting at the National Theatre in 2007.

She played the witch in the Norwegian 2012 movie Reisen til julestjernen and Vivian in then television adaption of the book The Half Brother that was broadcast on NRK in 2013.

Kittelsen's mother is Finnish.

Filmography

Short films 

 2006 : Bagasje : Hilde
 2006 : Road Movie : Celine
 2010 : Neglect : Ellinor

TV series 

 2004-2005 : Skolen : Anneli
 2005 : Brødrene Dal og mysteriet med Karl XIIs gamasjer : Mette-Mari Dal
 2008-2009 : Honningfellen : Signe Maria Øye
 2010- 2015 : Dag : Malin Tramell
 2013 : Halvbroren : Vivian
 2015 : Hæsjtægg : Vivi
 2017 : Neste Sommer : Gunnhild
 2019 : Beforeigners : Marie
 2019 : Exit : Hermine Veile
 2019 : Mellem os : Merete

Cinema 

 2008 : Max Manus by Joachim Rønning and Espen Sandberg : Tikken Lindebrække
 2009 : Millénium 3 - Luftslottet som sprängdes by Daniel Alfredson
 2010 : Happy Happy by Anne Sewitsky : Kaja
 2012 : Kon-Tiki by Joachim Rønning and Espen Sandberg : Liv Heyerdahl
 2012 : Reisen til julestjernen by Nils Gaup : Heksa
 2015 : Prästen i paradiset by Kjell Sundvall : Line
 2015 : Staying Alive by Charlotte Blom : Marianne
 2016 : Pyromaniac by Erik Skjoldbjærg : Elsa
 2018 : En affære by Henrik Martin Dahlsbakken : Henriette
 2019 : Skammerens datter II: Slangens gave by Ask Hasselbalch : Melussina
 2019 : Hjelperytteren by Jannicke Systad Jacobsen : Grete Stein

References

External links

Home page
Interview with Dagbladet 

1980 births
Living people
People from Kristiansand
Norwegian stage actresses
Norwegian film actresses
Norwegian television actresses
21st-century Norwegian actresses
Norwegian people of Finnish descent